Xiaoqiao is an unopened metro station of Zhengzhou Metro Chengjiao line.

Nail Household Controversy
The station was planned to open with other stations on Chengjiao line. However, a store stands on the planned site of an exit of the station and the owner refused to accept the compensation for expropriation. As a result, the exit could not be built. Due to insufficient exits, the station failed to meet the requirement of fire control acceptance and missed the scheduled opening date. The opening date is still unknown.

References 

Stations of Zhengzhou Metro
Chengjiao line, Zhengzhou Metro
Railway stations under construction in China